Maneckiite is a rare phosphate mineral with the formula(Na[])Ca2Fe2+2(Fe3+Mg)Mn2(PO4)6•2H2O. It was found in Michałkowa, Góry Sowie Block, Lower Silesia, Poland.

Relation to other minerals
Maneckiite is a member of the wicksite group.

References

Phosphate minerals
Sodium minerals
Calcium minerals
Iron(II,III) minerals
Manganese(II) minerals
Orthorhombic minerals
Minerals in space group 61